Big C Supercenter operates "hypermarkets" or "supercenters", modern retail businesses managed by Groupe Casino.It is one of the major retailers in the world, with over 200,000 employees working in more than 11,000 stores in Vietnam , Thailand, Argentina, Uruguay, Brazil, Colombia, France, Madagascar, and Mauritius.

Big C works with local manufacturers to develop their own brands, including "Wow! Attractive Price", "Bakery by Big C" and "Big C".

It is one of the largest shopping centers in Vietnam, with three supermarkets in the center of Vietnam, nine supermarkets in the north, and 10 locations in the south. Most items in Big C are made in Vietnam.

Export activities
The Export Department in Đồng Nai Province has exported local commodities, especially to Groupe Casino's members. In 2009, Big C Vietnam exported nearly 1,000 containers of commodities worth US$17 million.

Locations 
Big C has 36 stores throughout Vietnam.

References 

 L.K.L. "Việt Nam-lou tham dự vòng loại Châu Á Cúp Thế giới Bánh mì Bánh ngọt Louis Lesaffre" , Bao Dien Tu Cong Thuong
 Nguyên Hồng. "Nhãn hàng riêng và cuộc chơi của các siêu thị", Dien Dan Doanh Nghiep
 H.Đ. "Sức mua tại Big C tăng cao" , Hà Nội Mới
 Tuổi Trẻ. "Price hikes: Supermarkets say no to suppliers", Tuổi Trẻ news

Supermarkets of Asia